Albocosta lasciva is a moth of the family Noctuidae. It is found in the Alay Mountains, Uzbekistan and Tajikistan.

Noctuinae
Moths described in 1888